Methazolamide (trade name Neptazane) is a potent carbonic anhydrase inhibitor. It is indicated in the treatment of increased intraocular pressure (IOP) in chronic open-angle glaucoma and secondary glaucoma. Also it is used preoperatively in acute angle-closure (narrow-angle) glaucoma where lowering the IOP is desired before surgery. 

This drug has displayed teratogenic effects in rats. Compared to another drug in the same class, Acetazolamide, Methazolamide requires a lower dose when administered to patients.

References 
 
 
 
 

Acetamides
Carbonic anhydrase inhibitors
Sulfonamides
Thiadiazoles
Ophthalmology drugs